Events from the year 1852 in Canada.

Incumbents
Monarch — Victoria

Federal government
Parliament: 4th

Governors
Governor General of the Province of Canada — James Bruce, 8th Earl of Elgin
Colonial Governor of Newfoundland — Charles Henry Darling
Governor of New Brunswick — Edmund Walker Head
Governor of Nova Scotia — John Harvey
Governor of Prince Edward Island — Dominick Daly

Premiers
Joint Premiers of the Province of Canada —
Francis Hincks, Canada West Premier
Augustin-Norbert Morin, Canada East Premier 
Premier of Nova Scotia — James Boyle Uniacke
Premier of Prince Edward Island — John Holl

Events
January 15 – Trinity College opens
July 8 – Beginning of a fire which burns 11,000 houses in Montreal.
October – The Bank of Montreal issues notes like the Bank of England's; denomination water-marked.
October 25 – The Toronto Stock Exchange opens
November 10 – The Grand Trunk Railway Company is incorporated to build a railway between Toronto and Montreal.
December 8 – Laval's Seminaire du Quebec founds Université Laval, North America's oldest French Language university.

Full date unknown
1852 Newfoundland general election

Births

January 1 – Alexander Bethune, politician and 12th Mayor of Vancouver (died 1947)
March 22 – Theodore Davie, lawyer, politician and 9th Premier of British Columbia (died 1898)
April 5 – Alexander Warburton, politician, jurist, author and Premier of Prince Edward Island (died 1929)
August 19 – John Andrew Davidson, politician (died 1903)
September 9 – Fletcher Bath Wade, politician and barrister (died 1905)
September 24 – Joseph Martin, lawyer, politician and 13th Premier of British Columbia (died 1923)
November 2 – Paul Tourigny, politician (died 1926)

Deaths
 April 3 – Alexander Rankin, timber merchant, justice of the peace, politician, and office holder (born 1788)
 November 3 – Francis Gore, colonial administrator (born 1769)

References 

 
Canada
Years of the 19th century in Canada
1852 in North America